The Prelado State Park is a state park in the state of São Paulo, Brazil.

Location

The Prelado State Park is in the municipality of Iguape, São Paulo.
It is in the Atlantic Forest biome.
The park is classed as IUCN protected area category II (national park), with the objectives of preserving natural ecosystems of great ecological relevance and scenic beauty, enabling scientific research and developing educational activities, environmental interpretation, recreation in contact with nature and eco-tourism.

History

The Prelado State Park was created by decree 12.406 of the governor of São Paulo on 12 December 2006 from part of the Juréia-Itatins Ecological Station along the Juréia beach in the municipality of Iguape, including part of the coastal sea.
It included the Juréia-Itatins Ecological Station, Itinguçu and Prelado state parks, Despraiado and Barra do Una  sustainable development reserves and the Ilhas do Abrigo e Guararitama Wildlife Refuge.
On 11 September 2007 the procurer general of the state declared that the decree was unconstitutional.
The Juréia-Itatins Mosaic was suspended in 2009.

Law 14982 of 8 April 2013 altered the limits of the Juréia-Itatins Ecological Station, re-categorising some areas.
These were the  Itinguçu State Park,  Prelado State Park,  Barra do Una Sustainable Development Reserve  and  Despraiado Sustainable Development Reserve.
The law recreated the  Jureia-Itatins Mosaic.

Notes

Sources

2006 establishments in Brazil
Protected areas of São Paulo (state)
State parks of Brazil
Protected areas established in 2006